National Aerospace Laboratory may refer to:

National Aerospace Laboratory of Japan
National Aerospace Laboratories, Indian aerospace institution
Royal Netherlands Aerospace Centre, formerly known as the National Aerospace Laboratory